Horadandia is a small genus of cyprinid fish from South Asia.

Species
There are two recognized species:
 Horadandia atukorali Deraniyagala, 1943 – Sri Lanka
 Horadandia brittani Rema Devi and Menon, 1992 – India

References

Danios
Freshwater fish genera
Taxa named by Paulus Edward Pieris Deraniyagala